Dobrná is a municipality and village in Děčín District in the Ústí nad Labem Region of the Czech Republic. It has about 400 inhabitants.

Administrative parts
The village of Brložec is an administrative part of Dobrná.

References

Villages in Děčín District